Vanessa Fernanda Chalá Minda (born 13 March 1990) is an Ecuadorian judoka. She is a gold medalist at the South American Games and a two-time gold medalist at the Pan American Judo Championships.

Career 

At the 2019 Pan American Games held in Lima, Peru, she won one of the bronze medals in the women's 78 kg event.

In 2021, she competed in the women's 78 kg event at the Judo World Masters held in Doha, Qatar. A few months later, she won one of the bronze medals in her event at the 2021 Judo Grand Slam Antalya held in Antalya, Turkey. In June 2021, she competed in the women's 78 kg event at the 2021 World Judo Championships held in Budapest, Hungary.

She represented Ecuador at the 2020 Summer Olympics in Tokyo, Japan. She competed in the women's 78 kg event.

Achievements

References

External links
 

Living people
1990 births
Place of birth missing (living people)
Ecuadorian female judoka
Judoka at the 2011 Pan American Games
Judoka at the 2015 Pan American Games
Judoka at the 2019 Pan American Games
Medalists at the 2019 Pan American Games
Pan American Games medalists in judo
Pan American Games bronze medalists for Ecuador
South American Games medalists in judo
Competitors at the 2018 South American Games
South American Games gold medalists for Ecuador
Judoka at the 2020 Summer Olympics
Olympic judoka of Ecuador
21st-century Ecuadorian women
20th-century Ecuadorian women